Bollan may refer to:

People
Gary Bollan (b 1973), Scottish football player and manager
Hilary R. Bollan, chemist at the British Ministry of Defence
Jim Bollan, Scottish Socialist Party councillor.

Ships
, a German cargo ship in service 1928-36

See also
Bolan (disambiguation)
Bollon, Queensland, Australia